Siyannyambuugiin Dorjkhand (born 20 April 1941) is a Mongolian weightlifter. He competed in the men's bantamweight event at the 1972 Summer Olympics.

References

1941 births
Living people
Mongolian male weightlifters
Olympic weightlifters of Mongolia
Weightlifters at the 1972 Summer Olympics
Place of birth missing (living people)
20th-century Mongolian people